Fumibotys is a monotypic moth genus of the family Crambidae which was described by Eugene G. Munroe in 1976. Its single species, Fumibotys fumalis, the mint root borer moth, described by Achille Guenée in 1854, is found in most of North America.

References

Pyraustinae
Monotypic moth genera
Crambidae genera
Moths of North America
Taxa named by Eugene G. Munroe